The 2010–11 season of Bayer 04 Leverkusen began on 14 August 2010 with a DFB-Pokal match against FK Pirmasens, and ended on 14 May 2011, the last matchday of the Bundesliga, with a match against SC Freiburg. Leverkusen were eliminated in the second round of the DFB-Pokal and the round of 16 in the UEFA Europa League. They finished the season in second place in the Bundesliga.

Transfers

Summer transfers

In:

Out:

Winter transfers

In:

Out:

Goals and appearances

|}
Last updated: 14 May 2011

Results

Bundesliga

Note: Scores are given with Bayer Leverkusen score listed first.

UEFA Europa League

Note: Scores are given with Bayer Leverkusen score listed first.

DFB-Pokal

Note: Scores are given with Bayer Leverkusen score listed first.

See also
2010–11 Bundesliga
2010–11 DFB-Pokal
Bayer 04 Leverkusen

Bayer 04 Leverkusen
Bayer 04 Leverkusen seasons
Bayer 04 Leverkusen